The Augusta, Gibson and Sandersville Railroad was incorporated in 1884 and began operating from Augusta to Stapleton, Georgia, USA, in 1885.  In 1893, it went bankrupt and was reorganized as the Augusta Southern Railroad.  The line ran as  narrow gauge until 1895.

Defunct Georgia (U.S. state) railroads
3 ft gauge railways in the United States
Railway companies established in 1884
Railway companies disestablished in 1893
Predecessors of the Southern Railway (U.S.)
Narrow gauge railroads in Georgia (U.S. state)